Mount Bernstein is a prominent mountain, 2,420 m, which forms a part of the northern wall of Linder Glacier in the Lanterman Range, Bowers Mountains, a major mountain range situated in Victoria Land, Antarctica. The topographical feature was first mapped by the United States Geological Survey (USGS) from surveys and U.S. Navy air photos, 1960–64. Named by Advisory Committee on Antarctic Names (US-ACAN) for the late Captain Fred J. Bernstein, Asst. Chief of Staff for Operations and Plans, U.S. Navy Support Force, Antarctica, 1967 and 1968. The mountain lies situated on the Pennell Coast, a portion of Antarctica lying between Cape Williams and Cape Adare.

Mountains of Victoria Land
Pennell Coast